The Gwangju-Kia Champions Field is a baseball stadium in Gwangju, South Korea. It has been the home of KBO club Kia Tigers since 2014.

Records

See also 
Gwangju Mudeung Baseball Stadium

References

Baseball venues in South Korea
Sports venues in Gwangju
Kia Tigers
Sports venues completed in 2014
2014 establishments in South Korea